Antonio Giorgio (29 October 1897 – 27 June 1988) was an Argentine rower. He competed in the men's single sculls event at the 1936 Summer Olympics.

References

1897 births
1988 deaths
Argentine male rowers
Olympic rowers of Argentina
Rowers at the 1936 Summer Olympics
Place of birth missing